 was a Japanese photographer particularly known for nude photography.

Nakamura was born in Yokohama on 29 March 1926. After graduating in 1948 from the precursor of Chiba University, he moved through a series of employers photographing actors and doing still photography for films. He went freelance in 1951 and in 1954 joined with Yūji Hayata in setting up Hayata's studio. He was also doing work for the magazine Chūō Kōron.

From the mid-1950s Nakamura increasingly concentrated on nudes. (One appeared in the 30th anniversary issue of Life in 1966.) In 1958 he set up his own company, Masaya Studio (Masaya sutajio).

He married, then divorced Kiharu Nakamura before she moved to New York City.

Books showing Nakamura's works
Guramaa foto no utsushikata. Jitsuyō Hyakka Sensho. Tokyo: Kin'ensha, 1957. 
 Nus japonais. Paris: Editions Prisma, 1959. 
Young Nude. Camera-Art-sha, 1961. 
Nude nishi to higashi. Tokyo: Mainichi Shinbunsha, 1969. 
Ema nūdo in Afurika: Kami kara nusunda atsui hadaka / Ema Nude in Africa. Tokyo: Heibonsha, 1971.  Revised. Sonorama Shashin Sensho 13. Tokyo: Asahi Sonorama, 1978. 
Onna no anguru. Gendai Kamera Shinsho. Tokyo: Asahi Sonorama, 1976. 
Boku no shigoto: Nakamura Masaya. Special issue (bessatsu) of Photo Contest. Tokyo, 1976. 
Utsusareta onna / Woman's Sphere. Tokyo: Azuma Shuppan, 1978. 
Iki. Nihon no Kokoro 6. Tokyo: Shūeisha, 1981.  
 Nakamura Masaya. Shōwa Shashin Zenshigoto 8. Tokyo: Asahi Shinbunsha, 1983.
Denshin otama: Kaika sōshi. Tokyo: Canon Club, 1984. 
Kyō no shiki. Tokyo: Kumon, 1985. With haiku by Ushio Tsunemoto (Tsunemoto Ushio).
Ao kimono tachi. BeeBooks. Tokyo: Okamura, 1990. 
Hiru-sagari no shisen / A Midday Stroll. Genkōsha Mook 30 Photo Salon. Genkōsha, 1990. .
Supein. Tokyo: Nippon Camera, 1991. 
Yume machigusa. Nihon Manpower, 1992. .
Kyō ochikochi: Miyakobito to sennen no kokoro to shiki no en. BeeBooks. Tokyo: Okamura, 1993. . 
Nyūjīrando kikō / New Zealand. Tokyo: Nippon Camera, 1995. . 
Yūshun, sarabureddo. Kukizaki-machi, Ibaraki: Keiba Techō Sha, 1996. .
. JICC Photo Salon Library 78. Tokyo: JICC Photo Salon, 1998.
. JCII photo salon library 131. Tokyo: JICC Photo Salon, 2002.

References

  Nihon no shashinka / Biographic Dictionary of Japanese Photography. Tokyo: Nichigai Associates, 2005. . Despite the English-language alternative title, all in Japanese.
 Nihon nūdo meisakushū (Japanese nudes). Camera Mainichi bessatsu. Tokyo: Mainichi Shinbunsha, 1982.  Pp. 180–85. Reproductions of nude photographs taken in the 1960s.
 Nihon shashinka jiten / 328 Outstanding Japanese Photographers. Kyoto: Tankōsha, 2000. . P.236. Despite the English-language alternative title, all in Japanese.
 Shashinka wa nani o hyōgen shita ka: 1945–1960 (What were photographers expressing? 1945–1960). Tokyo: Konica Plaza, 1991.  Three nude photographs and CV, pp. 112–13.
 Shashinka wa nani o hyōgen shita ka: 1960–1980 (What were photographers expressing? 1960–1980). Tokyo: Konica Plaza, 1992. Three nude photographs and CV, pp. 18, 108.

External links
Ono, Philbert. Nakamura Masaya. PhotoGuide Japan.
 "The Photographer" at Fujifilm (with photographs).
 Chronology at Fujifilm.

Japanese photographers
1926 births
2001 deaths
People from Yokohama
Writers on photographic techniques
Chiba University alumni